Steven Lee Bender (September 7, 1950 – March 5, 2010) was an American entrepreneur and founder of both Altamira Group (Genuine Fractals) and iMagic Software (typing pattern recognition). Bender has made contribributions to digital imaging and Photoshop, and to authentication for distributed systems by supporting turning passwords into a biometric akin to fingerprints. Information technology analyst Rob Enderle  of the Enderle Group commented in January 2007 that this new technology is, "a compelling solution in a world where identity theft and illegal access are the greatest growing threats to a business or family".

Steve Bender's, and co-founder Howard Postley's, patented and patent-pending system is based on muscle memory, that people have reliable patterns hidden inside the simple act of typing a password.  By using these patterns, it is possible to distinguish the real users from impostors. This system extends the science often called Keystroke Dynamics.

In the '90s Steve's team developed Genuine Fractals at Altamira Group. Genuine Fractals was a plug-in for Photoshop and, for the first time, allowed images to go completely resolution independent—meaning a single image could be scaled from postage stamp to IMAX without loss of quality. Genuine Fractals won Best Product of the Year (EDDY) from Macworld Magazine in 1997 & 1998 [1], and is an industry standard now on version 5 from onOne Software.

References 
  -- "Key Sequence Rhythms" USA Patent 7,206,938.
 —MacWorld 1997 EDDY winners, Genuine Fractals wins Best Graphics Plug-in. Notable also because Genuine Fractals was the first product developed on PC and ported to Mac to win an EDDY
 —Steven Bender Bio, iMagic Software website, enterprise software vendor specializing in human authentication via typing rhythms.
 —Description of Trustable Passwords from CA.com, formerly Computer Associates
 —The importance of a biometric logon, from the Candid CIO blog
 —Article on the founding of iMagic Software and the first customer, Cottage Hospital, Santa Barbara, from the Santa Barbara News Press, cover article.
 —Obituary, from the Santa Ynez Valley Journal. (Scroll down)

External links
 The Enderle Group
  Description of Genuine Fractals features and importance
 Genuine Fractals version 5 from onOne Software
 Genuine Fractals from Adobe.com

American computer businesspeople
2010 deaths
1950 births
People from Russell, Kansas